Lokpriya Gopinath Bordoloi International Airport , also known as Guwahati International Airport and formerly as 'Borjhar Airport', is an international airport serving Guwahati, the  largest city of North-East India in Assam, India, and is also the primary airport of North-East India. It is the 12th busiest airport in India. It is located at Borjhar, 26 km (16 mi) from Dispur, the capital city of Assam and 28 km (18 mi) from Guwahati, and is named after Gopinath Bordoloi, a freedom fighter and the first Chief Minister of Assam after India's independence. The airport is managed by Airports Authority of India and also serves as an Indian Air Force base.

History

The airport has undergone numerous expansions and renovations since its establishment in 1958. It handled more than 3.7 million passengers in 2017, an increase of 36% from 2016.
The LGB Airport has witnessed annual traffic of over 23% in 2018–19 with a total footfall of 5.7 million passengers and 55,066 aircraft movements in the same period.
The existing terminal building at the airport has a maximum handling capacity of 850 arrival/departure passengers an hour.

In 2002, the first international flight operated by Air India from Guwahati to Bangkok, using an Airbus A310 aircraft, becoming the first international airport in the North-East region. However, the flight was withdrawn due to poor passenger load.

In January 2019, Guwahati won bids for two international destinations under the UDAN scheme, destinations being most anticipated Dhaka and Bangkok-Don Mueang.

In November 2021, Guwahati won bids for six international destinations under the UDAN scheme – Dhaka, Bangkok–Don Mueang, Kuala Lumpur, Singapore and Yangon.
In February 2019, the airport has been given on lease for 50 years to Adani Group at highest bid of Rs. 160 per passenger. Currently, international flights in the airport are operated by Drukair from Paro to Singapore, as a connecting flight.

New terminal 
To meet the growing demands and rising traffic in the future, the Airports Authority of India (AAI) has undertaken constructing a new second passenger terminal in the northern side of the airport, at a cost of ₹ 1,232 crores.

The new terminal building will be capable to handle 4,300 domestic and 200 international 
passengers during peak hours and about 10 million passengers annually. It will be equipped 
with 64 check-in counters, 20 self-check in kiosks, six baggage counters, in-line baggage security screening systems and 10 aerobridges. It will be an energy-efficient building, as it is expected to achieve a Green Rating for Integrated Habitat Assessment (GRIHA) 4-Star rating, with a solar roofing system for electricity generation, in addition to allowing maximum sunlight into the building. A photovoltaic solar plant with a power generation capacity of 540 kW will be developed at the terminal, along with eco-friendly measures such as a solid waste management system, wastewater treatment facility, rainwater storage facility and underground drainage system. With an area of 1,02,500 sq.m., the terminal will have two levels, consisting of the arrivals area at the lower level and departures area at the upper level. In addition to these two primary floors, there will be two more floors; a mezzanine surface between the two levels, which will act  as the boarding area of the terminal, and the other part will act as a service floor for the baggage handling system.

The design of the terminal building is inspired by Icarus, the Greek mythological figure who was one of the earliest inspirations of human flight. The airport's roof and the facade will be using the design of Origami.
 
As of 2021, more than 38% of the project work is completed and the new terminal building is 
scheduled to be ready by June 2022. However, due to the COVID-19 pandemic, which resulted in several delays in work due to lack of labour and restrictions, the terminal is now expected to be completed by the end of 2023 or in the first quarter of 2024.

Airlines and destinations

Passenger

Cargo

Statistics

See also
 Airports in India
 List of busiest airports in India by passenger traffic

References

External links

 Lokpriya Gopinath Bordoloi International Airport at Airports Authority of India website.
 Lokpriya Gopinath Bordoloi International Airport Official website.
 

Transport in Guwahati
Airports in Assam
International airports in India
Indian Air Force bases
1958 establishments in Assam
Airports established in 1958
20th-century architecture in India